Epirochroa is a genus of longhorn beetles of the subfamily Lamiinae.

 Epirochroa acutecostata Fairmaire, 1899
 Epirochroa affinis Breuning, 1957
 Epirochroa albicollis (Fairmaire, 1897)
 Epirochroa cervinocincta Fairmaire, 1899
 Epirochroa dujardini Breuning, 1970
 Epirochroa fairmairei Lepesme & Villiers, 1944
 Epirochroa fasciolata Fairmaire, 1899
 Epirochroa griseovaria Fairmaire, 1896
 Epirochroa sparsuta Breuning, 1957
 Epirochroa vadoni Breuning, 1957

References

Crossotini